The Women's artistic gymnastics floor exercise competition at the 2015 European Games was held in the National Gymnastics Arena, Baku, Azerbaijan on 20 June 2015.

Medalists

Qualification

The top six gymnasts with one per country advanced to the final.

 The tie between Lisa Verschueren, Valentine Pikul, Gaelle Mys, Seda Tutkhalyan, and Kelly Simm for sixth place was broken by highest execution score. Lisa Verschueren and Valentine Pikul both received the same execution score, and because they also received the same difficulty score, the tie remained. The same process was followed to break the tie between Dorina Böczögő and Tea Ugrin.

Results

 The tie between Lisa Verschueren and Silvia Zarzu for fourth place was broken by the execution score.

References 

Gymnastics at the 2015 European Games
2015 in women's gymnastics